Pedro Adriani Faife Fernández (born January 1, 1984 in Zulueta) is a Cuban football player who once played for Miami FC in the USL First Division.

Club career
Faife began his soccer career with his hometown team, Villa Clara, and played with the team until his defection to the United States in 2008, helping the team win the Campeonato Nacional de Fútbol de Cuba in 2004.

Faife defected from Cuba to the United States in 2008 in the hope of a securing professional career. Following his defection he trialed with several Major League Soccer clubs, including Chivas USA, but was not offered an MLS contract, and instead joined Miami FC of the USL First Division for the 2009 season.

International career
Faife was a member of Cuba's under 17 and 23 teams and in 2003 made his debut for the senior Cuba national team in a June 2003 friendly match against Panama. Faife subsequently made 35 appearances for the team over the next six years, but is not expected to make any more appearances for the national team since his defection to the United States. He was part of the Cuban squad at the 2003 CONCACAF Gold Cup, the 2005 CONCACAF Gold Cup, and the 2007 CONCACAF Gold Cup and represented his country in 6 FIFA World Cup qualifying matches.

His final international was a September 2008 FIFA World Cup qualification match against Guatemala.

International goals
Scores and results list Cuba's goal tally first.

Personal life

Defection to the United States

Faife defected to the United States when he disappeared from his hotel outside of Washington, D.C. before a CONCACAF 3rd round World Cup qualifier against the United States on 11 October 2008.

References

External links 
Miami FC bio

1984 births
Living people
People from Remedios, Cuba
Association football midfielders
Defecting Cuban footballers
Cuba international footballers
FC Villa Clara players
Miami FC (2006) players
2003 CONCACAF Gold Cup players
2005 CONCACAF Gold Cup players
2007 CONCACAF Gold Cup players
Cuban expatriate footballers
Cuban expatriate sportspeople in the United States
Expatriate soccer players in the United States
Cuban footballers